Babul Islam Mosque is a mosque located on the intersection of route 4 & route 50 in Oyama, Tochigi, Japan. It has a capacity of 600 persons in the main hall. Main activities include five times Salat, Salat ul Jumma, Salat ut Taraweeh, Salat ul Eid and weekly gathering for dars of Quran on Saturday. 
Other activities include Shahdah & Nikah arrangements, Gussul e Mayah (bathing of dead bodies), Janazah and other community works.

See also
 Islam in Japan

References

External links
 

Buildings and structures in Tochigi Prefecture
Mosques in Japan
Oyama, Tochigi